Harry's War is an Australian short film. It is written and directed by Richard Frankland produced by John Foss and Richard Franklin and stars David Ngoombujarra. It was broadcast nationally on SBS and ABC TV.

Harry's War is based on Frankland's Uncle, Harry Saunders (brother of Reg Saunders), who fought for Australia in the South Pacific in World War Two, and was killed in 1942. Saunders fought for his country in the hope that his actions would help Aboriginal people gain citizenship.

Awards
AFI Award (1999) - Best Screenplay in a Short Film (nominated)
Melbourne International Film Festival (1999) - OCIC Award
Hollywood Black Film Festival (2000) - Jury Prize for Best Short Film
St Kilda Film Festival (2000) - Best original Screenplay
Atom Awards (2000) - Best Short Film
Saint Tropez Film Festival (2000) - Best Short Film

References

External links
Golden Seahorse Productions
HARRY'S WAR Study Guide
Synopsis

Australian drama short films
1999 films
1990s war drama films
Australian war drama films
Pacific War films
Films set in Papua New Guinea
1999 short films
1990s English-language films
1990s Australian films
Australian World War II films
Films about Aboriginal Australians